Shangganling is a district of the prefecture-level city of Yichun in Heilongjiang Province, China. Name after Battle of Triangle Hill (Sanggamryong).

Administrative subdivisions of Heilongjiang